Minnesota State Highway 28 (MN 28) is a  state highway in west-central and central Minnesota, which travels from South Dakota Highway 10 at the South Dakota state line near Browns Valley and continues east to its intersection with the former route of U.S. Highway 10 (US 10) in Little Falls.

Route description
MN 28 serves as an east–west route between Browns Valley, Morris, Glenwood, Sauk Centre, and Little Falls.

The western terminus for MN 28 is at the South Dakota state line in Browns Valley, at the Little Minnesota River, where MN 28 becomes South Dakota Highway 10 upon crossing the state line.

MN 28 parallels MN 27 throughout its route until MN 27 enters Wheaton, Minnesota and then follows Mud Lake and Lake Traverse, heading South/Southwest to Browns Valley, Minnesota where it connects with MN 28.

The Sam Brown Memorial State Wayside Park is located on MN 28 in Traverse County at Browns Valley.

The highway overlaps MN 27 for the last  of its route, until its terminus in Little Falls at the former alignment of US 10, which is now a city street.

MN 28 is legally defined as Constitutional Route 28 in the Minnesota Statutes.

History
State Highway 28 was established November 2, 1920, traveling from the South Dakota border at Browns Valley to Little Falls.

By 1923, the road was mostly graveled except at its extreme western and eastern ends. The remainder was graveled by 1929.

The roadway was paved throughout the 1930s and was paved in full by 1940.

In 1934, the newly-marked State Highway 27 was overlapped with the eastern end of the route. The eastern terminus of Highway 28 remained at U.S. 10; however, when the bypass of 10 around Little Falls was built in the mid-1970s, 28 was not extended across the river and its terminus remains at Lindbergh Drive.

Major intersections

References

External links

Highway 28 at the Unofficial Minnesota Highways Page

028
Transportation in Traverse County, Minnesota
Transportation in Big Stone County, Minnesota
Transportation in Stevens County, Minnesota
Transportation in Pope County, Minnesota
Transportation in Stearns County, Minnesota
Transportation in Todd County, Minnesota
Transportation in Morrison County, Minnesota